Suikerbrood ("Sugar bread";) is a yeast-based bread. It is a Frisian luxury version of white bread, with large lumps of sugar mixed in with the dough. It contains a significant amount of sugar, traditionally added as nib sugar, though sometimes sugar cubes are used. While eaten throughout the Netherlands and Belgium, it is especially associated with Friesland. Suikerbrood is usually flavored with cinnamon and sometimes with ginger. Traditionally, a suikerbrood is given as a present to the parents after a baby's birth.

References

Dutch cuisine
Sweet breads